Ashina Huseluo (693–704) was a puppet khagan installed by Wu Zetian of the Wu Zhou dynasty.

Life 
Ashina Huseluo was the son of Ashina Buzhen who died in 667. His original title was Böri shad (歩利設). As a youth he saw Tang influence decline in favor of Tibetan Empire in Central Asia, thus he couldn't rule his ancestral lands and tribes. However, in 685 Wu Zetian made him Jiwangjue Khagan and Mengchi Protector-General in order to strengthen the rule in west.

In 690, he was made Jiezhong Shizhu Khagan for his valiant fights against the Tibetan Empire and the Second Turkic Khaganate. Reportedly he was harsh and ruthless towards his subjects.

After Ashina Tuizi's rebellion he was sent again to Suiye in 700, as the Commander-in-Chief of the Expeditionary Pingxi Force (平西軍大総管). However, after the rise of Wuzhile (chief of Turgesh), he did not dare to come back to the Western Region again. 

He died in 704, in Changan and was succeeded by Ashina Huaidao.

Source 

 Old Book of Tang / Volume 194

7th-century Turkic people
Ashina house of the Turkic Empire
Tang dynasty generals at war against the Göktürks
Tang dynasty generals at war against Tibet
Göktürk khagans